Schimmelmann is a surname. Notable people with the surname include:

Caroline von Schimmelmann, née Tugendreich Friedeborn (1730–1795), Danish countess
Charlotte Schimmelmann (1757–1816), Danish noble woman and salonist
Ernst Heinrich von Schimmelmann (1747–1831), German-Danish politician, businessman and patron of the arts
Heinrich Carl von Schimmelmann (1724–1782), German merchant, forgerer and banker during the Seven Years' War
Wulf von Schimmelmann (born 1947), German manager

See also
Immelmann (disambiguation)
Schmemann (disambiguation)